Qushuiting Street ( is a culturally significant alley in the 
historical center of the City of Jinan, Shandong Province, China. The history of the street can be traced 
back to the times of the Northern Wei dynasty (386–534).

Location

Qushuiting Street is located in the Lixia District of the historical 
urban center of Jinan.
The street follows the course of the Winding Water 
Creek (Qu Shui Creek) that flows northwards from the Palace Pool 
(spring pool of the Zhuoying Spring) into the Daming Lake. On 
it course, Qushuiting Street passes by the Fuxue Confucian Temple 
and the Hundred Flower Pond, before it ends on Daming Lake 
Road just south of the Daming Lake. The creek and hence the street are lined with willow trees along 
almost the entire length of the street.

History
The street was the site of an annual festival that has been documented since the times of the Northern Wei dynasty and continued until the beginning of the Qing dynasty (1644–1912): On the 3rd day of the 3rd month of the old Chinese calendar, scholar-bureaucrats gathered at the Palace Pool to ritually cleanse themselves. This was followed by a banquet along Qushuiting Street/Qushui Creek. Cups of alcohol were floated on trays along Qushui Creek. The scholars would sit next to the creek and compose poetry. If a participant's poem displeased the other guests, he would be obliged to drink more alcohol.

Cultural Significance

With its open, spring fed water course and willow trees, Qushuiting Street is a symbol of the historical city scape of Jinan that has been described by the late-Qing author Liu E in his novel "The Travels of Lao Can", written 1903–04, published in 1907). In a description that matches  Qushuiting Street, Liu E writes that "Every family has spring water, every household has a willow tree" ).

See also
Water Lily Street
List of sites in Jinan

References

Streets in China
Tourist attractions in Jinan